Namorona is a municipality in Madagascar. It is crossed by the Namorona River and it belongs to the district of Mananjary, which is a part of Vatovavy. This municipality has a population of 10,046 inhabitants in 2018.

Primary and junior level secondary education are available in town. The majority 96% of the population of the commune are farmers.  The most important crops are rice and cloves; also coffee is an important agricultural product. Services provide employment for 1% of the population. Additionally fishing employs 3% of the population.

Rivers
The Namorona River flows by this town.

References 

Populated places in Vatovavy